The Borod is a right tributary of the river Crișul Repede in Romania. It discharges into the Crișul Repede in Gheghie.

Tributaries

The following rivers are tributaries to the Borod:

Right: Răchita, Mișca, Cetea

References

Rivers of Romania
Rivers of Bihor County